The T–V distinction is the contextual use of different pronouns that exists in some languages and serves to convey formality or familiarity. Its name comes from the Latin pronouns tu and vos. The distinction takes a number of forms and indicates varying levels of politeness, familiarity, courtesy, age or even insult toward the addressee. The field that studies and describes this phenomenon is sociolinguistics.

Many languages lack this type of distinction, instead relying on other morphological or discourse features to convey formality. English historically contained the distinction, using the pronouns thou and you, but the familiar thou largely disappeared from the era of Early Modern English onward, with the exception of a few dialects. Additionally, British commoners historically spoke to nobility and royalty using the third person rather than the second person, a practice that has fallen out of favour. English speakers today often employ semantic analogues to convey the mentioned attitudes towards the addressee, such as whether to address someone by given name or surname or whether to use sir or madam. Under a broader classification, T and V forms are examples of honorifics.

The T–V distinction is expressed in a variety of forms. Two particularly common means are:
 Addressing a single individual using the second-person plural forms in the language, instead of the singular (e.g. in French).
 Addressing individuals with another pronoun with its own verb conjugations (e.g. in Spanish).

Origin and development 
This was a historical and contemporary survey of the uses of pronouns of address, seen as semantic markers of social relationships between individuals. The study considered mainly French, Italian, Spanish and German. The paper was highly influential and, with few exceptions, the terms T and V have been used in subsequent studies.

The status of the single second-person pronoun you in English is controversial among linguistic scholars.  For some, the English you keeps everybody at a distance, although not to the same extent as V pronouns in other languages. For others, you is a default neutral pronoun that fulfils the functions of both T and V without being
the equivalent of either, so an N-V-T framework is needed.

History and usage in language 

In classical Latin,  was originally the singular, and  the plural, with no distinction for honorific or familiar. According to Brown and Gilman, usage of the plural to refer to the Roman emperor began in the 4th century AD. They mention the possibility that this was because there were two emperors at that time (in Constantinople and Rome), but also mention that "plurality is a very old and ubiquitous metaphor for power". This usage was extended to other powerful figures, such as Pope Gregory I (590–604). However, Brown and Gilman note that it was only between the 12th and 14th centuries that the norms for the use of T- and V-forms crystallized. Less commonly, the use of the plural may be extended to other grammatical persons, such as the "royal we" (majestic plural) in English.

Brown and Gilman argued that the choice of form is governed by either relationships of "power" or "solidarity", depending on the culture of the speakers, showing that "power" had been the dominant predictor of form in Europe until the 20th century. Thus, it was quite normal for a powerful person to use a T-form but expect a V-form in return. However, in the 20th century the dynamic shifted in favour of solidarity, so that people would use T-forms with those they knew, and V-forms in service encounters, with reciprocal usage being the norm in both cases.

Early History 
In the Early Middle Ages (the 5th century to the 10th century), the pronoun  was used to address the most exalted figures, emperors and popes, who would use the pronoun  to address a subject. This use was progressively extended to other states and societies, and down the social hierarchy as a mark of respect to individuals of higher rank, religious authority, greater wealth, or seniority within a family. The development was slow and erratic, but a consistent pattern of use is estimated to have been reached in different European societies by the period 1100 to 1500. Use of V spread to upper-class individuals of equal rank, but not to lower class individuals.
This may be represented in Brown and Gilman's notation:

Modification 
Speakers developed greater flexibility of pronoun use by redefining relationships between individuals. Instead of defining the father–son relationship as one of power, it could be seen as a shared family relationship. Brown and Gilman term this the semantics of solidarity. Thus a speaker might have a choice of pronoun, depending on how they perceived the relationship with the person addressed. Thus a speaker with superior power might choose V to express fellow feeling with a subordinate. For example, a restaurant customer might use V to their favourite waiter. Similarly, a subordinate with a friendly relationship of long standing might use T. For example, a child might use T to express affection for their parent.

This may be represented as:

These choices were available not only to reflect permanent relationships, but to express momentary changes of attitude. This allowed playwrights such as Racine, Molière, Ben Jonson, Christopher Marlowe and Shakespeare to express a character's inner changes of mood through outward changes of pronoun.

For centuries, it was the more powerful individual who chose to address a subordinate either with T or with V, or to allow the subordinate to choose. For this reason, the pronouns were traditionally defined as the "pronoun of either condescension or intimacy" (T) and "the pronoun of reverence or formality" (V). Brown and Gilman argue that modern usage no longer supports these definitions.

Modern History 
Developments from the 19th century have seen the solidarity semantic applied more consistently. It has become less acceptable for a more powerful individual to exercise the choice of pronoun. Officers in most armies are not permitted to address a soldier as T. Most European parents cannot oblige their children to use V. The relationships illustrated above have changed in the direction of the following norms:

The tendency to promote the solidarity semantic may lead to the abolition of any choice of address pronoun. During the French Revolution, attempts were made to abolish V. In 17th century England, the Society of Friends obliged its members to use only T to everyone, and some continue to use T (thee) to one another. In most Modern English dialects, the use of T is archaic and no longer exists outside of poetry.

Changes in the 21st Century 
It was reported in 2012 that use of the French  and the Spanish  are in decline in social media. An explanation offered was that such online communications favour the philosophy of social equality, regardless of usual formal distinctions. Similar tendencies were observed in German, Persian, Chinese, Italian and Estonian.

History of use in individual languages

English 
The earliest entry in the Oxford English Dictionary for ye as a V pronoun in place of the singular thou exists in a Middle English text of 1225 composed in 1200. The usage may have started among the Norman French nobility in imitation of Old French. It made noticeable advances during the second half of the 13th century. During the 16th century, the distinction between the subject form ye and the object form you was largely lost, leaving you as the usual V pronoun (and plural pronoun). After 1600, the use of ye in standard English was confined to literary and religious contexts or as a consciously archaic usage.

David Crystal summarises Early Modern English usage thus:

V would normally be used
 by people of lower social status to those above them
 by the upper classes when talking to each other, even if they were closely related
 as a sign of a change (contrasting with thou) in the emotional temperature of an interaction

T would normally be used
 by people of higher social status to those below them
 by the lower classes when talking to each other
 in addressing God or Jesus
 in talking to ghosts, witches, and other supernatural beings
 in an imaginary address to someone who was absent
 as a sign of a change (contrasting with you) in the emotional temperature of an interaction

The T–V distinction was still well preserved when Shakespeare began writing at the end of the 16th century. However, other playwrights of the time made less use of T–V contrasts than Shakespeare. The infrequent use of T in popular writing earlier in the century such as the Paston Letters suggest that the distinction was already disappearing from gentry speech. In the first half of the 17th century, thou disappeared from Standard English, although the T–V distinction was preserved in many regional dialects. When the Quakers began using thou again in the middle of the century, many people were still aware of the old T–V distinction and responded with derision and physical violence.

In the 19th century, one aspect of the T–V distinction was restored to some English dialects in the form of a pronoun that expressed friendly solidarity, written as y'all. Unlike earlier thou, it was used primarily for plural address, and in some dialects for singular address as well. The pronoun was first observed in the southern states of the US among African-American speakers, although its precise origin is obscure. The pronoun spread rapidly to white speakers in those southern states, and (to a lesser extent) other regions of the US and beyond. This pronoun is not universally accepted, and may be regarded as either nonstandard or a regionalism.

Yous(e) (pron.) as a plural is found mainly in (Northern) England, Scotland, parts of Ireland, Australia, New Zealand, South Africa, northern Nova Scotia and parts of Ontario in Canada and parts of the northeastern United States (especially areas where there was historically Irish or Italian immigration), including in Boston, Philadelphia, New York, and scattered throughout working class Italian-American communities in the American Rust Belt. It also occurs in Scouse (the regional dialect of the Liverpool area).

French 
However, some emerging pattern of use has been detected by recent scholars. However,  was sometimes used to put a young man in his place, or to express temporary anger. There may also have been variation between Parisian use and that of other regions.

In the Middle French period, a relatively stable T–V distinction emerged. Vous was the V form used by upper-class speakers to address one another, while  was the T form used among lower class speakers. Upper-class speakers could choose to use either T or V when addressing an inferior. Inferiors would normally use V to a superior. However, there was much variation; in 1596, Étienne Pasquier observed in his comprehensive survey  that the French sometimes used  to inferiors as well as to superiors "" ("according to our natural tendencies"). In poetry,  was often used to address kings or to speak to God.

German 
In German, du is only used as an informal pronoun. It is only addressed to persons that one knows well, like family members and friends. It is also most commonly used among peers as a sign of equality, especially among young people. In formal situations with strangers and acquaintances, Sie is used instead. "Ihr" is also used as in formal situations; this was once the abundant usage, but it has largely fallen out of use. In the plural form, "ihr" is used as the "T" pronoun and "Sie" is used as the "V" pronoun; "Ihr" and "Sie" are capitalized when they are used as the "V" pronoun.

Scandinavian languages 

A T–V distinction was widespread in the North Germanic languages but its use began rapidly declining in the second half of the 20th century, coinciding with the 1960s youth rebellion. The V variant has in practice completely disappeared from regular speech in Swedish, Norwegian and Icelandic.

The use of the V variant in Danish has declined, but not disappeared. In Danish the T variant is "du" and the V variant is a capitalized "De".

Swedish both had a V-variant of "you" and an even more formal manner of addressing people, which was to address them in the third person ("Could I ask Mr. Johnson to...").

Hindi-Urdu 
Hindi-Urdu (Hindustani) have three levels of formality distinction. The pronoun तू تو (tū) is the informal (intimate) pronoun, तुम تم (tum) is the familiar pronoun and आप آپ (āp) is the formal pronoun. Tū is only used in certain contexts in Urdu, as in normal conversation, the use of tū is considered very rude. The pronoun तू تو (tū) is grammatically singular while the pronouns तुम تم (tum) and आप آپ (āp) are grammatically plural. However, the plural pronouns are more commonly used as singular pronouns and to explicitly mark the plurality, words such as लोग لوگ (log) [people], सब سب (sab) [all], दोनों دونوں (donõ) [both], तीनों تینوں (tīnõ) [all three] etc. are added after the plural pronouns.

In the Western Hindi dialects, a fourth level of formality (semi-formal), which is intermediate between आप آپ (āp) and तुम تم (tum), is created when the pronoun आप آپ (āp) is used with the conjugations of तुम تم (tum). However, this form is strictly dialectal and is not used in standard versions of Urdu and Hindi.

Use of names 
The boundaries between formal and informal language differ from language to language, as well as within social groups of the speakers of a given language. In some circumstances, it is not unusual to call other people by first name and the respectful form, or last name and familiar form. For example, German teachers used to use the former construct with upper-secondary students, while Italian teachers typically use the latter (switching to a full V-form with university students). This can lead to constructions denoting an intermediate level of formality in T–V-distinct languages that sound awkward to English-speakers.

Usage in language

Singular, plural and other ways of distinction 
In many languages, the respectful singular pronoun derives from a plural form. Some Romance languages have familiar forms derived from the Latin singular  and respectful forms derived from Latin plural , sometimes via a circuitous route. Sometimes, a singular V-form derives from a third-person pronoun; in German and some Nordic languages, it is the third-person plural. Some languages have separate T and V forms for both singular and plural, others have the same form and others have a T–V distinction only in the singular.

Different languages distinguish pronoun uses in different ways. Even within languages, there are differences between groups (older people and people of higher status tending both to use and to expect more respectful language) and between various aspects of one language. In Standard Peninsular Spanish, however,  (literally "you others") is still regularly used in informal conversation. In some cases, the V-form is likely to be capitalized when it is written.

Nominative case 
The following is a table of the nominative case of the singular and plural second person in many languages, including their respectful variants (if any):

Related verbs, nouns and pronouns 
Some languages have a verb to describe the fact of using either a T or a V form. Some also have a related noun or pronoun. The English words are used to refer only to English usage in the past, not to usage in other languages. The analogous distinction may be expressed as "to use first names" or "to be on familiar terms (with someone)".

See also 

 Honorific
 Honorifics (linguistics)
 Hypocorism
 Pluractionality, another plural device used for politeness
 Style (form of address)

References

Sources

External links
 

Etiquette
Personal pronouns
Sociolinguistics
Pragmatics
Grammatical number
Grammatical conjugation
Second-person pronouns